Mathieu Delahaigue (born 31 December 1987 in Sainte-Foy-lès-Lyon, Lyon, France) is a French former footballer who is last known to have played for Etoile FC

Career

Amateur career
Delahaigue is an amateur footballer who had played since 2006. He played in Ligue Rhone-Alpes of football from 2006 to 2018.

In 2007 Delahaigue had been selected in French university Football Team to play during the University World Cup of Futsal in Poland.

Professional career
Delahaigue  was invited to Singapore to play for Etoile FC, a club composed entirely of Frenchmen, in 2010 by his former coach Nicolas Posetti. He accepted the offer for one year despite thinking it was a joke, becoming second string goalkeeper . He was mostly used for friendlies, including one against the Singapore national team, Singapore national team of U23 and cup matches. During the match for third place in the RHB cup, he was named man of the match after a 3-0 victory for his team.

Unable to conceptualize a professional career in football as he was studying to be a history teacher, Delahaigue's contract was not extended and he returned to amateur football.

Reflecting on his one-year spell in Singapore, the French goalkeeper stated that he was not used to the hot climate and that the level of football there was between the French fifth and sixth divisions. He said he would advise a young player to go there as well.

References

External links 
 at Footballdatabase.eu

People from Sainte-Foy-lès-Lyon
Association football goalkeepers
1987 births
French expatriate sportspeople in Singapore
French footballers
Sportspeople from Lyon Metropolis
Living people
French expatriate footballers
Singapore Premier League players
Expatriate footballers in Singapore
Étoile FC players
Footballers from Auvergne-Rhône-Alpes